Yanick van Osch (born 24 March 1997) is a Dutch professional footballer who plays as a goalkeeper for Fortuna Sittard.

Club career
van Osch made his debut for Eerste Divisie side Jong PSV in 2015. His previous club was SV BLC. In the 2005–06 season, Van Osch joined PSV.

On 12 May 2020, van Osch signed a two-year contract, with the option of a third year, with Fortuna Sittard effective as of 1 July, after becoming a free agent. He was initially signed as a backup to starting goalkeeper, Alexei Koșelev.

References

External links
 
 Yanick van Osch page at official PSV site

Living people
1997 births
Sportspeople from 's-Hertogenbosch
Footballers from North Brabant
Association football goalkeepers
Dutch footballers
Netherlands youth international footballers
Netherlands under-21 international footballers
Jong PSV players
PSV Eindhoven players
Fortuna Sittard players
Eerste Divisie players